Mansour Al-Juaid (born 1 July 1948) is a Saudi Arabian sprinter. He competed in the men's 100 metres at the 1972 Summer Olympics.

References

External links
 

1948 births
Living people
Athletes (track and field) at the 1972 Summer Olympics
Saudi Arabian male sprinters
Olympic athletes of Saudi Arabia
Place of birth missing (living people)
20th-century Saudi Arabian people
21st-century Saudi Arabian people